Yenikənd (also, Yenikend) is a village in the Goychay Rayon of Azerbaijan. The village forms part of the municipality of Kürdşaban.

References 

Populated places in Goychay District